The Egypt national under-18 and under-19 basketball team is a national basketball team of Egypt, governed by the Egyptian Basketball Federation.
It represents the country in international under-18 and under-19 basketball competitions. The team is currently participating in the u18 Arab Basketball Championship

See also
Egypt national under-17 basketball team
Egypt women's national under-19 basketball team
Egypt men's national basketball team

References

External links
Archived records of Egypt team participations

Basketball teams in Egypt
Men's national under-19 basketball teams
Basketball